The 1999 Utah State Aggies football team represented Utah State University in the 1999 NCAA Division I-A football season as a member of the Big West Conference. The Aggies were once again led by head coach Dave Arslanian, who was in his second year with the program. The Aggies played their home games at Romney Stadium in Logan, Utah. Utah State finished with a 4–7 record, a one game improvement over 1998, but would dismiss Coach Arslanian at the end of the season.

Previous season
After a conference championship and bowl game in 1997, Utah State finished the 1998 season with a disappointing record of 3–8. The team had lost several close games early in the season, and would need two wins in the last three weeks of the season to avoid its worst finish since 1984.

Schedule

Season summary
The Aggies opened the season against the Georgia Bulldogs, a very strong team. They lost that opener 7–38 but bounced back after an easy win against Stephen F. Austin 51–17. The third game was against their rival, the Utah Utes. They did not beat the Utes, as they wouldn't win until 2012. They had a close win against BYU in the Old Wagon Wheel rivalry but lost 31–34, they would not win until 2010. After two losses in rivalries, they would win against Arkansas State and then fall into a 4 game slump. They got out of that slump against Nevada with a close win, 37–35. They finished off the season winning against North Texas 34–7. They ended the season with a record of 4–7, 3–3 in the Big West Conference.

Awards and honors
The Aggies had eleven players named to either the first or second all-conference team in the Big West.

References

Utah State
Utah State Aggies football seasons
Utah State Aggies football